Carol Smith is the former head softball coach at LSU. She was the first head coach in program history and had an overall record of 45–28–0.

Coaching career

LSU
Smith led the LSU Tigers softball team from 1979 to 1981 until the program was disbanded after the 1981 season. Smith led her teams to a 16–7 record in 1979, 15–9 record in 1980 and 14–12 record in 1981.

References

Living people
American softball coaches
LSU Tigers softball coaches
Year of birth missing (living people)